24 Cephei is a single, yellow-hued star in the northern circumpolar constellation of Cepheus. With an apparent visual magnitude of 4.79, it is faintly visible to the naked eye. It is moving closer with a heliocentric radial velocity of −17 km/s.

Keenan and McNeil (1989) listed a stellar classification of G7 II-III for 24 Cep, matching the spectrum of an evolved G-type star with blended features of a bright giant and a giant star. Older sources list a class of G8 III, which would suggest an ordinary giant star. At the age of 234 million years, it has an estimated 3.5 times the mass of the Sun and has expanded to about 13 times the Sun's radius. The star is radiating 199 times the Sun's luminosity from its enlarged photosphere at an effective temperature of 5,023 K. These coordinates are a source of X-ray emission.

References

G-type bright giants
G-type giants
Cepheus (constellation)
Durchmusterung objects
Cephei, 24
210807
109400
8468